Jan Polák (born 26 March 1989) is a Czech football defender .

Playing career 
Polak joined Polish first division club Piast Gliwice in August 2012 and played with them for two seasons.

In September 2014, he was confirmed as having been signed by Italian Lega Pro (third division) outfit Juve Stabia on a free transfer. In the summer of 2016 accords with Cremonese.

In early 2017, he returned to Slovan Liberec.

On 24 January 2019, he signed with Serie C club Teramo.

On 15 July 2019, he signed a 2-year contract with Südtirol. He left the club at the end of 2020–2021 season.

References

External links 
 
 
 

1989 births
Living people
Sportspeople from Liberec
Czech footballers
Association football defenders
Czech First League players
FC Slovan Liberec players
FC Viktoria Plzeň players
FK Ústí nad Labem players
Ekstraklasa players
Piast Gliwice players
Serie C players
S.S. Juve Stabia players
U.S. Cremonese players
Casertana F.C. players
S.S. Teramo Calcio players
F.C. Südtirol players
Czech expatriate footballers
Expatriate footballers in Poland
Expatriate footballers in Italy
Czech Republic youth international footballers
Czech Republic under-21 international footballers